Lagueria Davis  is an American film director, writer and producer. She is best known for her work on the films Light in Dark Places and 1 in 3.

Career
Davis holds a BFA in Media Art from the University of Oklahoma. Remember Me a pilot she wrote was a 2016 WeScreenplay TV competition semi-finalist. Maid of Dishonor a feature she co-wrote was a Nicholls Fellowship Quarter-Finalist in 2016. Her short film, Light in Dark Places,  won best short film at the 2019 ClexaCon Film Festival. Recently, She was selected as a 2019 BAVC Media Maker Fellow with her current project, Black Barbie: A Documentary. She is a board member of the Alliance of Women Directors.

Filmography

References

External links
 

Living people
American film directors
American women film directors
Year of birth missing (living people)
University of Oklahoma alumni
21st-century American women